Oracle PowerBrowser was a web browser created by Oracle Corporation in 1996. It was discontinued mainly because of speed issues.

Features 
Features of Oracle PowerBrowser included:

 Support for Java and Basic scripting
 Support for Java applets
 A drag-and-drop web server called "Personal Server"
 A Database Wizard that helps users make Web applications using a database
 Support for Network Loadable Objects that extend browser functionality
 Support for SSL 2.0 and 3.0

See also 
List of web browsers

References

External links
Evolt Browser Archive: PowerBrowser

1996 software
Discontinued web browsers